This is a list of notable manufacturers of 3D printers. 3D printers are a type of robot that is able to print 3D models using successive layers of material.

0–9 

 3D makeR Technologies – Barranquilla, Colombia
 3D Systems – Rock Hill, South Carolina, USA

A-B 

 AIO Robotics – Los Angeles, California, USA
 Airwolf 3D – Costa Mesa, California, USA
 Aleph Objects – Loveland, Colorado, USA – (Lulzbot printers), (owned by FAME 3D)
 B9Creations - Rapid City, South Dakota, USA

C-F 

 Carbon – Redwood City, California, USA
 Cellink – Boston, Massachusetts, USA
 CRP Group – Modena , Italy
 Creality – Shenzhen, China
 Desktop Metal – Burlington, Massachusetts, USA
 envisionTEC (ETEC) – Gladbeck, Germany, (owned by Desktop Metal)
 Formlabs – Somerville, Massachusetts, USA
 Fusion3 – Greensboro, North Carolina, USA

G-L 

 Geeetech – Shenzhen, China
 HP Inc. – Palo Alto, California, USA
 Hyrel 3D – Norcross, Georgia, USA
 Kikai Labs – Buenos Aires, Argentina
 Kudo3d – Dublin, California, USA

M 

 M3D – Fulton, Maryland, USA
 Made In Space, Inc. – Mountain View, California, USA
 MakerBot – New York City, New York, USA
 Materialise NV – Leuven, Belgium
 Markforged - Massachusetts, USA
 Mcor Technologies Ltd – Dunleer, Ireland

N-Q 

 Printrbot – Lincoln, California, USA
 Prusa Research – Prague, Czech Republic

R 

 Renishaw plc - Wotton-under-Edge, Gloucestershire, UK
 Robo3D – San Diego, California, USA

S-T 

 Sciaky, Inc. – Chicago, Illinois, USA
 Sindoh – Seoul, South Korea
 SLM Solutions Group AG – Lübeck, Germany
 Solidscape – Wilton, New Hampshire, USA
 Stanley Black & Decker – New Britain, Connecticut, USA (Manufactured by Sindoh – South Korea)
 Stratasys – Minneapolis, Minnesota, USA and Rehovot, Israel

U-Z 

 Ultimaker – Geldermalsen, Netherlands
 Velleman – Gavere, Belgium
 Voxeljet – Friedberg, Germany
 Zortrax – Olsztyn, Poland
 ZYYX – Gothenburg, Sweden

See also 
 Comparison of 3D printers
 3D printing processes

References 

 
3D
3D